Ryther is a surname. Notable people with the surname include:

 Augustine Ryther (died 1593), English engraver and translator
 Megan Ryther (born 1979), American freestyle swimmer 
Thomas Ryther

See also
 Ryther, North Yorkshire, in Ryther cum Ossendyke, England
 Rytter